Nāfiʿ ibn al-Ḥārith ibn Kalada al-Thaqafī (died 13 AH / 634 – 635 CE)) was an Arab physician of the Banu Thaqif. He was recommended by Muhammad, and treated Sa'd ibn Abi Waqqas and Abu Bakr. When the latter was dying, he designated his illness as poisoning.

Life and career
Trained in Yemen, he is reported to have written a book named Dialog in Medicine. He was also a student and teacher at the Academy of Gundishapur in Persia.

He was half brother of Abu Bakra al-Thaqafi (also known as Nufay ibn al-Harith).

Some historians maintain that he received his medical education at the Jundishapur medical school of Persia where he learnt the teachings of Aristotle and Galen.

See also
 Al-Harith ibn Kalada
 List of notable Hijazis
 Nadr ibn al-Harith
 Sahaba

References

Companions of the Prophet
Physicians of the medieval Islamic world
670 deaths
7th-century physicians
Abu Bakr
Year of birth unknown
Banu Thaqif